Veravjen, also rendered as Viravjen, may refer to:
 Veravjen-e Olya
 Veravjen-e Sofla